The Association of Certified Engineering Technicians and Technologists of Prince Edward Island (ACETTPEI) is Prince Edward Island's independent certifying body for engineering/applied science technicians and technologists.

ACETTPEI confers the designations "C.Tech.", "C.E.T." and "A.Sc.T." which are symbols of achievement in engineering/applied science technology and are legally protected for use only by fully certified members.  The designations are recognized across Canada by many employers and other engineering professionals through the efforts of provincial associations that make up the Canadian Council of Technicians and Technologists (CCTT).  Though CCTT being a signatory, ACETTPEI recognizes international transferability through the Sydney Accord.

ACETTPEI was established in 1972.

In 2007 ACETTPEI, with the assistance of other Atlantic Canada Technology organizations and some federal government funds, held the Atlantic Canada Technology Roundtable.  This was a meeting of private, public, and educational sectors to examine the issues of technology skills shortages which may have hampered economic growth in the region and is expected to get worse due to baby boomer retirement.

ACETTPEI has registered the tradename Island Technology Professionals.

See also
Engineering technologist
Certified Engineering Technologist
Professional Technologist
Engineering Technology
Sydney Accord
Island Technology Professionals

External links
ACETTPEI official page
Canadian Council of Technicians and Technologists (CCTT)
The report on the Atlantic Canada Technology Roundtable 2007

Professional associations based in Canada